Kepler-1625b is a super-Jupiter exoplanet orbiting the Sun-like star Kepler-1625 about  away. The large gas giant is approximately the same radius as Jupiter and orbits its star every 287.4 days. In 2017, hints of a Neptune-sized exomoon in orbit of the planet was found using photometric observations collected by the Kepler Mission. Further evidence for a Neptunian moon was found the following year using the Hubble Space Telescope, where two independent lines of evidence constrained the mass and radius to be Neptune-like. The mass-signature has been independently recovered by two other teams. However, the radius-signature was independently recovered by one of the teams but not the other. The original discovery team later showed that this latter study appears affected by systematic error sources that may influence their findings.

Characteristics

Mass and radius
Kepler-1625b is a Jovian-sized gas giant, a type of planet several times greater in radius than Earth and mostly composed of hydrogen and helium. It is 11.4 times Earth's radius, approximately equal to that of the planet Jupiter. However, it is up to 11.6 times more massive (about 3,700 Earth masses), based on radial velocity observations. This puts it just below the deuterium-fusing limit, which is around 13 Jupiter masses. Any more massive and Kepler-1625b would be a brown dwarf. However, this mass value only corresponds to an 3-sigma upper limit and the mass of the planet remains undetected at this time.

Orbit and temperature
Unlike the gas giants in our Solar System, Kepler-1625b orbits much closer, slightly closer than the orbital radius as the Earth around the Sun. The planet takes  to orbit Kepler-1625, as a result of the star's slightly greater mass than the Sun. Kepler-1625b receives 2.6 times more insolation than the Earth, meaning it lies at the inner edge of the habitable zone. However, as the planet has likely no solid surface, bodies of liquid water are impossible.

Candidate exomoon

In July 2017, researchers found signs of a Neptune-sized exomoon (a moon in another solar system) orbiting Kepler-1625b using archival Kepler Mission data.

In October 2018, researchers using the Hubble Space Telescope published new observations of the star Kepler-1625 which revealed two independent lines of evidence indicative of a large exomoon Kepler-1625b I. These were a 20-minute Transit Timing Variation signature that indicated an approximately Neptune-mass moon, and an additional photometric dip that indicated a Neptune-radius moon. The relative phasing of the two signatures was also consistent with that which a real moon would cause, with the effects in anti-phase. The study concluded that the exomoon hypothesis is the simplest and best explanation for the available observations, though warned that it is difficult to assign a precise probability to its reality and urged follow-up analyses.

In February 2019, a reanalysis of the combined Kepler and Hubble observations recovered both a moon-like dip and similar transit timing variation signal. However, the authors suggested that the data could also be explained by an inclined hot-Jupiter in the same system that has gone previously undetected, which could be tested using future Doppler spectroscopy radial velocity measurements. A second independent reanalysis was published in April 2019, which recovered one of the two lines of evidence, the transit timing variation, but the not the second, the moon-like dip. The original discovery team responded to this soon after, finding that this re-analysis exhibits stronger systematics in their reduction which may be responsible for their differing conclusion.

References

Giant planets in the habitable zone
Exoplanets discovered by the Kepler space telescope
Exoplanets discovered in 2016
Cygnus (constellation)